Celesc is the electricity utility for the southern Brazilian state of Santa Catarina. In 2014, the company had around 2.6-million customers and sold around 23.3 TWh of electricity. It generates power from 16 plants, all of them hydroelectric, with installed capacity of around 126MW. The company also owns some 5,100 km of distribution lines and a 148,164 km distribution network. Celesc is headquartered in the Santa Catarina capital of Florianópolis.

It is controlled by the state of Santa Catarina, who owns just over 20% of Celesc's stocks, that are traded on B3 (formerly BM&F Bovespa).

In October 2006, the company passed by a reorganization process, in which it was transformed into a "holding" that kepts the name Centrais Elétricas de Santa Catarina. Two new companies had been created, one of them responsible for the distribution (Celesc Distribuição) and another responsible for the generation of electric power (Celesc Geração).

References

External links

 The company's home page in Portuguese

Companies listed on B3 (stock exchange)
Electric power companies of Brazil
Companies based in Florianópolis
Government-owned companies of Brazil
Brazilian companies established in 1955
Energy companies established in 1955